Hurricane Music Group is an American hip hop collective and independent record label formed in 2012. The collective was founded by its most notable member Nyzzy Nyce (aka Nyzzy), an American Rapper from Fort Wayne, Indiana. The collective consists of songwriters, video directors, producers, talent managers, motion and graphic designers. Each member shares similar interests in music, fashion, style, and art. The label is distributed by 3D, a subsidiary of Duck Down Music Inc., a music-marketing and consulting firm with its own distribution network assisting with the navigation of the indie landscape. Releases have garnered national blog and broadcast coverage as well as placements with feature films, network television, and professional sports teams
With other artist from Fort Wayne

References

External links
 Company Website
 Nyzzy Nyce YouTube
 Nyzzy Nyce VEVO
 Nyzzy Nyce SoundCloud

Hip hop record labels
American independent record labels
Record labels established in 2012
American companies established in 2012